"Roll with the Wind" is a song by Norwegian singer–songwriter Alexander Rybak from his debut studio album, Fairytales. "Roll with the Wind" was written by Mårten Eriksson and Lisa Eriksson and produced by Amir Aly.

Music video
A music video for "Roll with the Wind" was filmed on the island Giske in Norway, in July 2009. It was released on September 15, 2009.

Charts
"Roll with the Wind" entered the Norwegian charts on 2 June 2009 at 16#. At the same time, Rybak had two other singles in the top 3, "Funny Little World" and "Fairytale". The next week it climbed to No. 10. The single dropped out of the Top 20 in its 3rd week.

Release history

Other versions
A version of the song, sung in Swedish and with the title "Vända med vinden", was featured on the 2010 debut album Längtan by Swedish group Timoteij. This version features Alexander Rybak on violin.

German CD single track list

 Roll with the wind
 No Milk Today (Herman's Hermits Cover)

References

Alexander Rybak songs
2009 singles
2009 songs
Songs written by Lina Eriksson
EMI Records singles